Dewing is a surname that may refer to the following people:
Ely B. Dewing (1834–1902), American merchant and politicians
Maria Oakey Dewing (1845–1927) was an American painter
Martha Dewing Woodward (1856–1950), American artist and art teacher
Thomas Dewing (1851–1938), American painter, husband of Maria 

English-language surnames